Meta.Numerics is an open-source library for advanced scientific computing on the .NET platform. It provides an object-oriented API supporting advanced functions, matrix algebra, statistics, optimization, and other numerical algorithms.

History 
Version 1.0 was released in April 2009. The current version 4.1.4 was released in August 2020. It has been used in academic research and software development.  It is listed in the software index of the Digital Library of Mathematical Functions.

References

External links 
 Meta.Numerics Website
 Meta.Numerics Project on GitHub
 Meta.Numerics Project on CodePlex

Numerical software
C Sharp libraries
Software using the MS-PL license